The third competition weekend of the 2018–19 ISU Speed Skating World Cup was held at the Arena Lodow Tomaszów Mazowiecki-Lodsch in Tomaszów Mazowiecki, Poland, from Friday, 7 December, until Sunday, 9 December 2018.

Schedule
The detailed event schedule:

Medal summary

Men's events

Women's events

Standings
Standings after completion of the event.

Men

500 m

1000 m

1500 m

5000 and 10.000 m

Mass start

Team pursuit

Team sprint

Women

500 m

1000 m

1500 m

3000 and 5000 m

Mass start

Team pursuit

Team sprint

References

3
ISU World Cup, 2018-19, 3
2018 in Polish sport
Sport in Tomaszów Mazowiecki
ISU Speed Skating